Camarones is a station along Line 7 of the Mexico City Metro.  It is located in Colonia Barrio Santa Cruz Acayucan district in the Azcapotzalco borough, north of Mexico City, Mexico.  The station was opened with the others along the northern portion of Line 7 on 29 November 1988.

Its name and logo come from a town that once existed nearby, the town of Camarones. Camarón means shrimp, a name given because the adjoining river was home to a plentiful species of shrimp, known locally as Acociles (Cambarellus montezumae), which were part of the prehispanic, colonial and early 20th century diet of the inhabitants of Mexico City.
Near Camarones metro station is the Mexico City oil refinery. It also connects with trolleybus line I, which runs between Metro Chapultepec and Metro El Rosario.

Ridership

References

External links 

Camarones
Railway stations opened in 1988
1988 establishments in Mexico
Mexico City Metro stations in Azcapotzalco
Accessible Mexico City Metro stations